Ashok Kumar Jain High School Darihat in Rohtas Bihar, India, popularly known as Darihat High School, was established in 1947. It is located in Darihat village of Rohtas district of Bihar on Dehri-Nasariganj Road. It is one of the leading government high schools of Rohtas district. It is a boys and girls school.

Introduction 
Ashok Kumar Jain High School Darihat was established in 1947 with the aid from Rohtas Industries Limited, hence the name Ashok Kumar Jain. It has classes from 8th to 10th standard. It is one of the leading high schools of the district.

Students attend from Darihat, Maudihan, Chilbila, Ayar Kotha, Paruri, Tandawa(Tarwan), Paruhar, Majhiaon, Shivpur, Aharaon, Tiwaridih, Khudraon, Dhelabag, Arjun Bigaha, Dharahara, Berkap, Bharkuriya, Sherpur and Chainpur. It is the only government high school for these villages.

In year 1986 its then principal Jagnarayan Tiwari was awarded prestigious President medal.

See also
 Education in Bihar
 Education in India

References

External links
 Location at Wikimapia
 Facebook page

Boys' schools in India
High schools and secondary schools in Bihar
Rohtas district
Educational institutions established in 1947
1947 establishments in India